From my Window, Without a Home… is a Quebec feature film produced, written and directed by Maryanne Zéhil. The film tells the story of a Lebanese woman who leaves her country and family to settle in Montreal. It features Louise Portal, Renée Thomas, Leyla Hakim, Walid El Alayli, Hélène Mercier, Jean-François Blanchard, Mariloup Wolfe, Catherine Colvey and Sébastien Ricard.

Plot
At four years old, Dounia’s mother, Sana, emigrates to Canada, leaving her daughter behind in burning and bloody Beirut, Lebanon. Seventeen years later, after the death of her father, Dounia comes to Montreal to meet a mother she no longer remembers.

Once in Montreal, Dounia quickly realizes that her mother is a stranger to her. Sana avoids talking about the past, yet she is forced to confront it, little by little. Communication between the two women is awkward, and Dounia's stay is drawing to a close. It seems impossible for Sana to return to Beirut, yet circumstances provoke it. Returning to the homeland she once fled like the [plague, Sana has no choice but to face her past.

Cast

Release 
The film premiered at the Rendez-vous Québec Cinéma on 26 February 2006.

References

External links
 

2006 films
2006 drama films
Canadian drama films
Lebanese drama films
Quebec films
Films set in Montreal
Films shot in Montreal
2000s Canadian films